The voiced velar implosive is a type of consonantal sound, used in some spoken languages. It is familiar to English speakers as the sound made when mimicking the 'gulping' of water.

Features

Occurrence

See also
 List of phonetics topics
 Voiceless velar implosive

Notes

References

External links
 

Implosives
Central consonants
Voiced oral consonants